Hikan-e Bala (also Romanized as Ḩīkān-e Bālā; also known as Ḩīkān, Hīkān-e ‘Olyā, Hikūn-e ‘Olyā, and Hīkūn ‘Olyā) is a village in Hotkan Rural District, in the Central District of Zarand County, Kerman Province, Iran. At the 2006 census, its population was 60, in 15 families.

References 

Populated places in Zarand County